is a city located in Ishikawa Prefecture, Japan. , the city had an estimated population of 13,531 in 6013 households, and a population density of 54.6 persons per km2.

Etymology
Suzu is thought to have been named after Suzu Shrine, an ancient Shinto shrine located in the Awazu area of the city. The name "Suzu" appears in Nara period records; however, the kanji for Suzu (珠洲) is not thought to have been in use until the early Wadō era (713 AD). There is also the theory that the name originates from the Ainu language, as with several other place names in the Noto area.

Geography
Suzu occupies the northeastern tip of the Noto Peninsula and is bordered by the Sea of Japan on three sides. Parts of the city are within the borders of the Noto Hantō Quasi-National Park.

Neighbouring municipalities 
Ishikawa Prefecture
Wajima
Noto

Climate
Suzu has a humid subtropical climate (Köppen Cfa) characterized by mild summers and cold winters with heavy snowfall.  The average annual temperature in Suzu is 13.0 °C. The average annual rainfall is 2234 mm with September as the wettest month. The temperatures are highest on average in August, at around 25.4 °C, and lowest in January, at around 2.4 °C.

Demographics
Per Japanese census data, the population of Suzu has declined steadily over the past 50 years.

History 
In ancient times, Suzu prospered as a gateway for trade by sea, establishing connections with places such as Izumo, Sado and Ezo. In turn, Suzu was introduced to ironware culture from a considerably early period in the Izumo era, and even gained crucial agricultural influence and knowledge to develop an agricultural society. In fact, it is thought that such ancient Noto culture originated and spread outwards from the tip of the Noto Peninsula.

In the second year of the Yōrō (718), Noto Province consisting of the 4 districts of Suzu, Fugeshi, Hakui and Noto was established. For a short period of time, the land was claimed as part of Etchū Province. During this period the famous Ōtomo no Yakamochi recited a poem about the picturesque scenery of Suzu Bay, which would later be included in the famous poetry anthology Man'yōshū.
Later in the Kōji period (1143), Noto Provincial Governor Minamoto no Toshikane established Wakayama shōen which grew to become the largest estate in Noto, expanding territory to take over the majority of land in Suzu. Around this time, production of Suzu ware began, which was exported as far as Hokkaido. The area was also noted from ancient times for the production of salt.

During the Sengoku period (1467–1568), the area was contested between the Hatakeyama clan, Uesugi clan and Maeda clan, with the area becoming part of Kaga Domain under the Edo-period Tokugawa shogunate. Following the Meiji Restoration, the area was organised into one town (Iida) and 14 villages in 1889. These municipalities merged on 15 July 1954 to form the city of Suzu.

Government
Suzu has a mayor-council form of government with a directly elected mayor and a unicameral city legislature of 14 members.

Economy

Industries 

Agriculture: (Wet-land rice, Matsutake mushrooms, charcoal, and other crops)
Commercial fishing: Processing of marine goods
Livestock: Noto Beef, a regionally renowned brand
Ceramics: Portable stoves called shichirin and Suzu ware are the chief ceramic goods produced in the city. Also, diatomaceous earth is found almost anywhere within the city limits, and it has been used for ceramics since the Edo period.
Salt: Salt is still manufactured traditionally with evaporation ponds, particularly through the Agehama method of artificially flooded saltpans
Sake: There are several sake producers in the area, including the Sougen Sake Brewery

More recently, Suzu has become known for its production of specialized charcoal for use in the Japanese tea ceremony.

Education
Suzu has seven public elementary schools and four middle schools operated by the city government, and one public high school operated by the Ishikawa Prefectural Board of Education. The prefectural also operates one special education school.

Transportation
Noto Railway's Noto Line ran from Anamizu Station to Suzu's Takojima Station until April 2005, when the line was permanently closed. Today, the city does not have any passenger railway service.

Highway

Mass Media

Newspapers 
Hokuriku Chunichi Shimbun (Chunichi Shimbun Co.), Suzu Correspondence Division
Hokkoku Shimbun, Suzu Branch Office

Cable television 
Nouetsu Cablenet

Sister city relations
  Pelotas, Brazil, since September 1963

Local attractions

Places 
Suzu Shrine
Mitsukejima, also called "Battleship Rock"
Rokkozaki Lighthouse
Suzu-yaki Museum
Godzilla Rock

Festivals 
Iida-machi Toroyama Festival (Established by the city as an important intangible folk culture asset in 1996)
Houryuu Tanabata Kiriko Festival 
Held on the first Saturday of August in Ukai, Houryuu-machi.  A 14 meter tall kiriko is carried by a group of young people on their shoulders around the Ukai area in Houryuu-machi.  Although the kiriko in Jike, Misaki-machi is recognized as being the biggest in Japan, the kiriko used in this festival is the largest among kiriko that are carried on the shoulders.  In the final stages of the festival, with fireworks in the background, the kiriko is pushed towards the sea and the participants do boisterous dance in the sea around pine torches.

References

External links 

 

 
Cities in Ishikawa Prefecture
Populated coastal places in Japan